The 2021–22 North Alabama Lions men's basketball team represented the University of North Alabama in the 2021–22 NCAA Division I men's basketball season. The Lions, led by third-year head coach Tony Pujol, played their home games at Flowers Hall in Florence, Alabama, as members of the West division of the ASUN Conference. They finished the season 9–21, 2–14 in ASUN play to finish in last place in the West division. They lost to Florida Gulf Coast in the first round of the ASUN tournament.

This season marked North Alabama's final year of a four-year transition period from Division II to Division I. As a result, the Lions were not eligible for NCAA postseason play.

Previous season
In a season limited due to the ongoing COVID-19 pandemic, the Lions finished the 2020–21 season 13–11, 7–8 in ASUN play to finish in fifth place. They defeated North Florida and Florida Gulf Coast before losing in the finals of the ASUN tournament to Liberty.

Roster

Schedule and results

|-
!colspan=12 style=| Non-conference regular season

|-
!colspan=9 style=| ASUN Conference regular season

|-
!colspan=12 style=| ASUN tournament

|-

Source

References

North Alabama Lions men's basketball seasons
North Alabama Lions
North Alabama Lions men's basketball
North Alabama Lions men's basketball